Nina Alekseevna Yeryomina (2 November 1933 – 24 August 2016) was a Russian basketball player. She was a 1959 world champion, two-time European champion, four-time Soviet Union champion, Merited Master of Sport of the USSR (1959), and sports commentator.

At the European Championships in 1960 in the three seconds before the end of the match with the Bulgarian national team, Nina threw the ball, earning her the title of champion of the Soviet national team.

In 2000, she played herself in the movie The Envy of Gods.

She died on 24 August 2016 in Moscow Oblast.

Awards 
 Order of the Badge of Honour
 Medal For Labour Valour
 Jubilee Medal In Commemoration of the 100th Anniversary of the Birth of Vladimir Ilyich Lenin
Merited Master of Sport of the USSR

References

External links
 Два символа жизни Нины Ерёминой, sport.rian.ru 
 Нина Ерёмина: Мы не имели права на второе место — SportBox.ru, news.sportbox.ru 
 «Когда звучал мой первый репортаж, я под стол залезла». Судьба первой женщины-комментатора, sports.ru 

1933 births
2016 deaths
Basketball players from Moscow
Russian women's basketball players
Soviet women's basketball players
Honoured Masters of Sport of the USSR
FIBA EuroBasket-winning players
Sports commentators
Russian sports journalists
Basketball announcers
Russian radio personalities
Moscow State Textile University alumni